{{Infobox football club
| clubname = Salamanca UDS B
| image = 
| image_size = 200px
| fullname = Salamanca Club de Fútbol UDS "B"
| founded = 2016
| ground = Pistas del Helmántico Villares de la Reina, Castille and León, Spain
| capacity = 5,500
| owner = 
| chairman = Manuel Lovato
| chrtitle = President
| manager = Javier Guillén
| mgrtitle = Head coach
| league = 3ª RFEF – Group 8
| season = 2020–21
| position = 3ª – Group 8 (A), 8th of 113ª  – Group 8 (E), 2nd of 11 | website = https://salamancacfuds.es
| pattern_la1 = _salamanca1920h 
| pattern_b1 = _salamanca1920h 
| pattern_sh1 = _salamanca1920h 
| pattern_ra1 = _salamanca1920h 
| pattern_so1 = 
| leftarm1 = FFFFFF 
| body1 = FFFFFF 
| rightarm1 = FFFFFF 
| shorts1 = 000000 
| socks1 = FFFFFF
| pattern_la2 = _salamanca1920a 
| pattern_b2 = _salamanca1920a 
| pattern_ra2 = _salamanca1920a 
| pattern_sh2 = _salamanca1920a 
| pattern_so2 = 
| leftarm2 = 1C34FF 
| body2 = 1C34FF 
| rightarm2 = 1C34FF 
| shorts2 = 1C34FF 
| socks2 = 880000
}}Salamanca Club de Fútbol UDS "B", previously known as CF Salmantino "B", is a Spanish football team based in Salamanca, in the autonomous community of Castile and León. Founded in 2016, it is the reserve team of Salamanca UDS, and currently plays in Tercera División RFEF – Group 8, holding home games at the Pistas del Helmántico with a 5,500-seat capacity.

History
Salamanca B was created in 2016, as Club de Fútbol Salmantino B, as a reserve team of Salamanca CF UDS; the side was initially to the Primera Provincial, one division above the first team which was in the Primera Regional at the time. The club achieved promotion to the fifth division in 2018, and won another promotion to Tercera División in the following year.

 Season to season 2 seasons in Tercera División1''' season in Tercera División RFEF

References

External links 
Official website 
La Preferente team profile 

Association football clubs established in 2016
2016 establishments in Castile and León
B-team
Spanish reserve football teams